William Ludel (sometime credited Bill Ludel) is an American television soap opera director.

Directing credits
Another World
 Director (1972-1974)

General Hospital
 Director (1994–present)

Days of Our Lives
 Occasional Director (1990s)

Awards and nominations
Daytime Emmy Award
Win, 2000, 2004-2006, Directing Team, General Hospital
Nomination, 1994-1999, 2001, Directing Team, General Hospital

Directors Guild of America Award
Nomination, 2007, Directing, General Hospital (Ep. #11177)
Nomination, 2002, Directing, General Hospital (shared with Howard Ritter, Christine Magarian, Ronald Cates, Craig McManus, Susan Diamant-Neigher, Kathleen Ladd, Denise Van Cleave, and Penny Pengra(Ep. #9801)
Nomination, 1996, Directing, General Hospital (Ep. #8248)

External links

Playbill Article
WT Festival
THE ANTAEUS COMPANY

American television directors
Living people
Year of birth missing (living people)
Directors Guild of America Award winners
Daytime Emmy Award winners